UAE First Division League is the second tier of football league competition in the United Arab Emirates.

As of 2020–21, the league features 15 sides who play each other in a home and away round-robin format, with a total of 28 games for each team. The top two sides gain promotion to the UAE Pro-League. On 29 May 2019, UAEFA announced that a UAE Second Division League to be established with smaller clubs, privately owned clubs, football academies with semi-professional teams compete for promotion to UAE Division one. On 6 July 2022, UAEFA announced that the number of participants will increase to 17 teams for the 2022–23 season. An increase of 2 teams, promoted from the UAE Second Division, and no relegation for UAE First Division clubs from the 2021–22 season, in an expansion season.

Current teams
''Note: Table lists clubs in alphabetical order.

List of champions
Source:

 1974–75: Al-Shabab
 1975–76: Al Rams
 1976–77: Al-Wahda
 1977–78: Oman Club
 1978–79: Khor Fakkan Club
 1979–80: Ittihad Kalba
 1980–81: Al Rams
 1981–82: Al Khaleej
 1982–83: Al-Jazira
 1983–84: Al Qadsia Club 
 1984–85: Al-Wahda
 1985–86: Fujairah
 1986–87: Ras Al Khaima
 1987–88: Al-Jazira
 1988–89: Ittihad Kalba
 1989–90: Fujairah
 1990–91: Not completed due to Gulf War
 1991–92: Al Urooba
 1992–93: Al-Shaab
 1993–94: Al Khaleej
 1994–95: Baniyas
 1995–96: Ittihad Kalba
 1996–97: Emirates
 1997–98: Al-Shaab
 1998–99: Ittihad Kalba
 1999–00: Sharjah
 2000–01: Al Khaleej
 2001–02: Al-Dhafra
 2002–03: Emirates
 2003–04: Dubai
 2004–05: Baniyas
 2005–06: Fujairah
 2006–07: Al-Dhafra
 2007–08: Al Khaleej
 2008–09: Baniyas
 2009–10: Ittihad Kalba
 2010–11: Ajman
 2011–12: Ittihad Kalba
 2012–13: Emirates
 2013–14: Ittihad Kalba
 2014–15: Dibba Al-Fujairah
 2015–16: Hatta 
 2016–17: Ajman
 2017–18: Baniyas
 2018–19: Khor Fakkan
 2019–20: Not completed due to COVID-19 pandemic
 2020–21: Al Urooba
 2021–22: Dibba Al Fujairah 

Al Khaleej was renamed in June 2017 to the match the name of the city Khorfakkan*

Champions

Performance by club

1 Club no longer exists.

Performance by city

Performance by emirates

Top scorers
1999–2000:  Razzaq Farhan (42 goals)
2007–08:  Modibo Kane Diarra (44 goals) (Record)
2008–09:  Nabil Daoudi (36 goals)
2009–10:  Michaël N'dri (10 goals)
2010–11:  Patrick Fabiano (19 goals)
2011–12:   Makhete Diop (29 goals)
2012–13:  Modibo Kane Diarra (24 goals)
2013–14:  Modibo Kane Diarra (27 goals)
2014–15:  Michaël N'dri (24 goals)
2015–16: Tássio Maia dos Santos (17 goals)
2016–17: Adeílson Pereira de Mello (23 goals)
2017–18: Marcus Vinícius Araujo Silva (21 goals)
2018–19: Vinícius Lopes  (16 goals)
2019–20: Alexssander azeredo  Vinícius Lopes  (11 goals)
2020–21: Diogo Acosta (20 goals)
2021–22: Diogo Acosta (27 goals)

References

External links
UAE FA Official website 

Football leagues in the United Arab Emirates
Second level football leagues in Asia